Dr. Zvi Gabbay is a partner and the Head of the Capital Markets and Financial Regulation Department at the Barnea & Co. law firm. Prior to this, Dr. Gabbay served as the Head of Enforcement and a member of management at the Israel Securities Authority (ISA).

Education 
Upon completing his military service as an officer and combatant in the Nahal Infantry Brigade of the Israel Defense Forces, Gabbay studied law at the Hebrew University of Jerusalem, earning his LL.B. He went on to receive his Master of Laws degree (LL.M) magna cum laude from Bar-Ilan University. Gabbay continued his studies in New York at Columbia University, where he earned a second Master of Laws degree summa cum laude in 2004.

During his studies, Gabbay worked as a teaching assistant, as well as took part in the mediation clinic at Columbia University. After receiving his second LL.M., Gabbay continued his academic studies at Columbia University, earning a Doctor of Juridical Science (J.S.D.) in 2006. His research focused on alternatives to the criminal justice system, based on analyses of administrative law, disciplinary hearings, and restorative justice.

Public Activities 
Gabbay served as a member of the committee assembled by former Minister of Justice Yaakov Neeman, and headed by then Deputy Attorney-General (criminal matters) Raz Nazari, which re-examined the issue of corporate criminal liability. The committee published a memorandum for the draft bill Criminal Liability for Corporations Law (2014).

Gabbay is currently a member of the board of governors of the International Institute for Restorative Practices (IIRP) Europe.

Gabbay is also a member of the board of governors of Amutat Kedem, an Israeli NPO that engages in conciliatory processes using family group conferences and restorative justice to help children at-risk youth, and youth offenders.

During his residence in the United States, Gabbay engaged in volunteer work, mediating more than 50 cases in the various courts in New York. He also served as a moderator and mediator in the Community Impact Panel program, which convened at the Midtown Community Court in Manhattan. Gabbay volunteers as a mediator in business disputes in Israeli courts.

Career 
Gabbay began his legal career as a prosecutor in the Tel Aviv District Attorney’s Office (Criminal Department). There he managed all stages of criminal cases, from investigations, trials, and rulings through to appeals. Upon completing his studies in New York, Gabbay joined the international law firm Skadden, Arps, Slate, Meagher & Flom LLP. During his tenure at the firm, Gabbay focused on representing private and business clients undergoing internal investigations, working in collaboration with the firm’s civil litigation department. He also engaged in pro bono representation of clients in civil and criminal courts.

Gabbay returned to Israel in 2008 and was appointed the Head of Enforcement and a member of management at the Israel Securities Authority (ISA). As Head of Enforcement, Gabbay handled the interfaces between the regulatory arm of the ISA and the enforcement powers it wields. In this context, he engaged in legislative initiatives and in forging new regulations. Gabbay was also part of the lean team that drove the enactment of the Administrative Enforcement Law.

In 2011, Gabbay left the ISA and became a partner at the Gornitzky and Co. law firm. Two years later, in 2013, he resigned and founded a boutique capital markets law firm: Adini, Berger, Gabbay.

In 2016, Gabbay joined Barnea & Co. as a partner and department head. Gabbay provides assistance and legal counsel to public companies and investment houses in Israel on issues involving the capital market and corporate governance. Gabbay also represents clients before various enforcement bodies in relation to investigations and administrative inquiries.

Academic lectures 

Gabbay was a guest lecturer at the College of Law and Business, where he taught a seminar on white collar crime. He has also lectured at both the School of Law at the College of Management and the School of Law at Columbia University on mediation and negotiations.

Books 

 Administrative Enforcement of Israeli Securities Laws, Bursi Publishing House

External links
Zvi Gabbay, Regulation of Digital Coins, The Marker (in Hebrew) website, August 28, 2017. 
Zvi Gabbay, "Who knew: Mobileye-Intel Corp. Deal", Calcalist (in Hebrew) website, April 19, 2017
Zvi Gabbay and Sapir Malul, “Hedge Funds Don’t Need Regulating,” The Marker (in Hebrew) website, July 5, 2016  
“Where is the Money,” 103fm (in hebrew), June 20, 2017 
Channel 2 News, Mako (in hebrew), June 20, 2017
"Decentralized Finance (DeFi) –The Future of Finance?", Zvi Gabbay in Barnea Blog, October 15, 2020

References 

Israeli businesspeople
Israeli lawyers
Columbia Law School alumni
Living people
Skadden, Arps, Slate, Meagher & Flom people
Year of birth missing (living people)